William Gregory Malone (born March 8, 1956) is a Canadian former professional ice hockey centre and former scout for the Pittsburgh Penguins, Phoenix Coyotes, and Tampa Bay Lightning.

Career
Malone was a scoring star in Fredericton, New Brunswick before moving on to the Oshawa Generals of the OHA. After recording consecutive 30-goal seasons, the Pittsburgh Penguins selected him in the second round, 19th overall in the 1976 NHL Entry Draft. He went on to spend the majority of his career with the Penguins followed by three productive years with the Hartford Whalers. Malone was traded from Hartford to the Quebec Nordiques for Wayne Babych but never produced with his new team and retired in 1987.  Overall, he had a productive NHL career, scoring a total of 501 points (191 goals and 310 assists) in 704 career games.

A year after his retirement, then general manager Tony Esposito hired Malone to the Penguins' scouting staff. He won 2 Stanley Cups with the Pittsburgh Penguins in 1991 and 1992 when he was serving as the head scout for the team. Greg Malone was the Chief Scout for the Pittsburgh Penguins until the offseason in 2006 when he became a scout with the Phoenix Coyotes. His younger brother Jim Malone was a first round pick of the New York Rangers. He is the father of former Pittsburgh Penguins and Tampa Bay Lightning forward Ryan Malone and uncle of Carolina Hurricanes forward Brad Malone. He is also uncle of the MJAHL's Miramichi Timberwolves current captain Brett Malone.

Malone currently coaches youth hockey at the Baierl Ice Complex in Warrendale, PA.

Career statistics

Regular season and playoffs

References
 Legends of Hockey  Retrieved 13 October 2006.

External links
 

1956 births
Arizona Coyotes scouts
Canadian ice hockey centres
Hartford Whalers players
Ice hockey people from New Brunswick
New Brunswick Sports Hall of Fame inductees
Indianapolis Racers draft picks
Living people
Oshawa Generals players
People from Miramichi, New Brunswick
Pittsburgh Penguins draft picks
Pittsburgh Penguins players
Pittsburgh Penguins scouts
Quebec Nordiques players
Stanley Cup champions
Tampa Bay Lightning scouts
Canadian expatriate ice hockey players in the United States